This is a timeline of the presence of Eastern Orthodoxy in Greece from  1821 to 1924. The history of Greece traditionally encompasses the study of the Greek people, the areas they ruled historically, as well as the territory now composing the modern state of Greece.

Greek War of Independence (1821–1829)

1821 Greek War of Independence begins as Metr. Germanos of Patras declares Greek independence on Day of Annunciation (25 March), also Kyrio-Pascha, at the Monastery of Agia Lavra, Peloponnese; martyrdom of Patr. Gregory V of Constantinople, Abp. Kyprianos of Cyprus, and Abp. Gerasimos (Pardalis) of Crete in retaliation; former Ecumenical Patriarch Cyril VI of Constantinople (1813–18) is hanged at the gate of Adrianople's cathedral; Metropolitans Gregorios of Derkon, Dorotheos of Adrianople, Ioannikios of Tyrnavos, and Joseph of Thessaloniki are decapitated on the Sultan's orders in Constantinople; Metropolitans Chrysanthos of Paphos, Meletios of Kition and Lavrentios of Kyrenia are executed in Nicosia, Cyprus; Turkish Cypriot mobs hang most of the Greek Cypriots in Larnaca and other towns, among them an archbishop, five bishops, thirty six ecclesiastics; storming of Tripolitza, marking an early victory in the Greek War of Independence; liberation fighters started calling themselves "Hellenes" (for continuity with their ancient Hellenic heritage), rather than using the generic "Romioi" (Ρωμιοί, which referred to both their Roman citizenship and religious affiliation to Orthodox Christendom); death of Nikephoros of Chios.

1822 Greek Constitution of 1822 is adopted on 1 January by the First National Assembly at Epidaurus, stating that "all those indigenous inhabitants of the State of Hellas who believe in Christ are Hellenes" (Section B, Paragraph 2); the Chios massacre takes place, a total of about 100,000 people perish; decisive Greek victory at the Battle of Dervenakia over the superior forces of Mahmud Dramali Pasha saved the War of Independence; English poet Percy Bysshe Shelley writes the verse drama Hellas with a view to raising money for the Greek War of Independence.
1823 Wonderworking Icon of Panagia Evangelistria found on Tinos, led by a vision from Saint Pelagia of Tinos (†1834), becoming the most venerated pilgrimage item in Greece at the Church of Evangelistria; martyrdom of Hieromonk Christos of Ioannina; Lord Byron agreed to act as agent of the London Philhellenic Committee, sending £4,000 of his own money to prepare the Greek fleet and joining statesman Alexandros Mavrokordatos, revered in Greece as a national hero.
1824 Inspired by Philhellenist Lord Byron, American physician Samuel Gridley Howe joined the Greek army as a surgeon, becoming known for his bravery, enthusiasm, and ability as a commander, as well as his humanity, winning him the title the "Lafayette of the Greek Revolution," later writing an account of the revolt titled Historical Sketch of the Greek Revolution, published in 1828.

1825 Archimandrite Gregorios Dikaios ("Papaflessas") is killed during the Battle of Maniaki on 20 June, fighting against the forces of Ibrahim Pasha at Maniaki, Messenia.
1826 The Exodus of Messolonghi (Greek: Έξοδος του Μεσολογγίου) occurred from 10–11 April 1826 (Lazarus Saturday - Palm Sunday), under the leadership of Notis Botsaris, Kitsos Tzavelas and Dimitrios Makris, against the Ottoman forces of Reşid Mehmed Pasha and the Egyptian forces led by Ibrāhīm Pasha, resulting in several thousand Greek deaths and thousands of women and children being enslaved, ultimately increasing the Philhellenist movement in Europe and having a significant influence on the eventual decision of Britain, France and Russia to intervene militarily in the Battle of Navarino (1827) and secure Greece's independence.
1827 Russia, Britain and France in London recognize autonomy of Greece, and agree to force truce on Ottoman Sultan; Ioannis Kapodistrias is elected provisional president of Greece (Governor of Greece).
1828 In May Patriarch Agathangelos I dispatched a mission of four very senior prelates from the patriarchal synod to Greece bringing letters addressed to  'the clergy and notables of the Peloponnese and the Aegean Islands', whereby they were asked to resubmit to the Sublime Porte; Greek church opened in London (2nd time).
1829 Treaty of Adrianople ends Greek War of Independence, culminating in the creation of the modern Greek state, after over 600 years of foreign occupation (around 250 years of Frankish occupation and 375 years of Ottoman Turkish occupation).

First Hellenic Republic (1829–1832)

c. 1829 The purified and formal Katharevousa variety of Modern Greek is promoted as the official language (to 1976); Ioannis Kapodistrias made Nafplion the first official capital of modern Greece (1829–1834).
1830 Inauguration of the Church of Our Lady of Tinos, who is considered a patron saint of the Greek nation; the fully sovereign status of Greece was accepted in the London Protocol of 3 February 1830.
1832 Treaty of Constantinople, European powers establish Greek protectorate; Otho I was chosen king of Greece by the great powers at the conference of London in May 1832.

Kingdom of Greece (1833–1924)

1833 Instigated by Georg von Maurer and led by Theoklitos Pharmakidis (a Greek Orthodox priest influenced by German Protestant thought), the National Assembly at Nauplio declares the Church of Greece independent (autocephalous) from the Ecumenical Patriarchate of Constantinople.
1833–1834 Dissolution of the monasteries: the "Bavarokratia" closes down 600 monasteries and nationalises monastic land-holdings, allowing Protestant missionaries to work undisturbed.
1835 On 2 February the Ecumenical Patriarch Constantius II of Constantinople (1834–35) celebrating with 12 bishops and an enormous flood of the faithful, consecrated the rebuilt Church of the Life-Giving Font dedicating it to the Most Holy Theotokos.
1837 School of Theology at the National and Capodistrian University of Athens founded.

1838 Council of Constantinople held, attended by Patriarchs Gregory VI of Constantinople and Athanasius V of Jerusalem, whose main theme was the Unia, and the extermination of Latin dogmas and usages; death of New Martyr George of Ioannina.
1839 Theophilos Kairis of Andros condemned and imprisoned for teaching a form of Deism.
1842 Construction of the Metropolitan Cathedral of Athens is begun on Christmas Day, 1842 with the laying of the cornerstone by King Otto and Queen Amalia, dedicated 20 years later on 21 May 1862 in honor of the Annunciation of the Virgin.
1844 Theological School of Halki founded; Manthos and Georgios Rizaris, benefactors and members of the Filiki Eteria organization, funded the building of the Rizareios Ecclesiastical School in Athens, which continues to function as a religious and educational institution today, based in Halandri, Athens; Prime Minister Ioannis Kolettis first coined the expression the "Great Idea" (Megali Idea), envisaging the restoration of the Christian Orthodox Byzantine Empire with its capital once again established at Constantinople, becoming the core of Greek foreign policy until the early 20th century; King Otho I, a Roman Catholic in an Eastern Orthodox country, was forced to grant the Constitution of 1844 (after the rebellion of 3 September 1843), specifying that his eventual successor be Orthodox.
1845 Death of priest and scholar Neophytos Doukas, author of a large number of books and translations of ancient Greek works, and one of the most important personalities of the Greek Enlightenment during the Ottoman occupation of Greece.
1847 At nearly eighty years of age, the monk Christophoros Panayiotopoulos (Papoulakos) c. 1770–1861, undertook a popular preaching mission in the villages of Achaea to revitalize the spiritual conditions of the people which were slowly becoming westernized with an Enlightenment ideology, affecting the sociological make up of the newborn Greek state within a decade; ultimately Papoulakos helped bring the Greek people back to their roots in Orthodoxy and the Christian ideal, for which he suffered much persecution from both the Church and State and died in exile, and is today renowned as a great ascetic and hero of modern Greece.
1848  Encyclical of the Eastern Patriarchs  sent by the primates and synods of the four ancient patriarchates of the Orthodox Church, condemning the Filioque as heresy, declaring the Roman Catholic Church to be heretical, schismatic, and in apostasy, repudiating Ultramontanism (papal supremacy) and referring to the Photian Council of 879-880 as the "Eighth Ecumenical Council."

Autocephalous Era (from 1850)

1850 After tortuous and protracted negotiations, the Permanent Synod in Constantinople presided over by Patr. Anthimos IV of Constantinople recognised the autocephaly of the Church of Greece; due to certain conditions issued in the "Tomos" of autocephaly, the Church of Greece must maintain special links to its "Mother Church", the Ecumenical Patriarchate.

1852 By Law 201 (Grk.: ΣΑ') of 1852, the Greek government, ignoring reference to the Patriarchal Tome of 1850, revised certain articles of the Pharmakidis-Maurer Church constitution (of 1833), however without changing the Church's subjection to the state; liberal Greek theologian Theoklitos Pharmakidis, a proponent of the ideas of Adamantios Korais and the Greek Enlightenment, published The Synodal Tomos or Concerning Truth, a strong attack on the conditions found in the Tomos of Autocephaly of 1850, arguing that there was nothing uncanonical about the establishment set up in 1833, and stating that: "the Eastern Church is everywhere joined to the state, never being separated from it, never divided from the sovereigns since Byzantine times, and always subordinate to them."
1853 At the start of the Crimean War (1853-1856), fought ostensibly over which church would be recognized as the "sovereign authority" of the Christian faith in the Holy Land and Russia's claim of protection over the Greek Christians in the Turkish Empire, the French Roman Catholic Abp. of Paris Marie-Dominique-Auguste Sibour stated that this was a holy war against the Orthodox.
1854-1859 Piraeus was occupied by the Anglo-French fleet to ensure Greek neutrality during the Crimean War (1853–56) and to forestall Greek expansionist intentions.
1855 The Holy Cross School of Jerusalem (Theological School of the Patriarchal Throne of Jerusalem) is founded under Patriarch Cyril II of Jerusalem, located at the Monastery of the Holy Cross, functioning for about fifty years with some interruptions (1855-1909).
1856 Death of Neophytos Vamvas, Greek cleric and educator who had translated the Bible into Modern Greek.
1857 Death of Konstantinos Oikonomos, by common consensus the most important 19th-century Greek churchman and theologian, being the only person to criticize the Bavarian regime on an intellectual level, and an implacable opponent of Pharmakidis' theological ideals, symbolizing Greece's ecclesiastical consciousness at that time; in March 1857, when Konstantinos III was still enthroned as the Greek Metropolitan of Trebizond, 150 Crypto-Christian village leaders of Kromni, Santa, Koasi and other regions went to the Panagia Theoskepastos Monastery in Trebizond, and inside the church took an oath to reveal their Christianity and remain faithful in the face of exile or death, thus openly declaring their Orthodox Christian faith.{{#tag:ref|"A report of the British sub-consul A. Stevens in 1857 addressed to the British ambassador Stanford regarding the Kromni district in Pontus, stated that in 55 villages, 9,535 Muslims resided there, 17,260 Crypto-Christians and 28,960 Christian Greeks. Gervassios the Bishop of Sevastia made reference to the Crypto-Christians of Asia Minor by saying that, after European interventions there in the year 1858, 25,000 of them confessed publicly their Christian creed. The return to Christianity by these Ottoman subjects frightened the authorities who followed the developments with great unease."<ref>Theofanis Malkidis (Lecturer, Democritus University of Thrace). THE CRYPTO-CHRISTIANS OF PONTUS. Pontusworld.com. Retrieved: 19 September 2014.</ref>|group=note}}
1857–66 J.P. Migne produces the Patrologia Graeca in 162 volumes, including both the Eastern Fathers and those Western authors who wrote before Ecclesiastical Latin became predominant in the Western Church in the 3rd century.
1860 The Ottoman Government tries to intervene in Athonite affairs with a constitution drawn up by Hushni Pasha, the Governor of Thessaloniki.
1863 George I enthroned as King of Greece, whose long reign (1863–1913) was the formative period for the development of Greece as a modern European state.
1864 Holy Trinity Church (New Orleans, LA) becomes the first Orthodox parish to be established on American soil, by Greeks; the Ionian Islands (Eptanisa) are united with Greece, and were transferred in 1866 to the jurisdiction of the Greek Church from Constantinople.

 1865-94 Renowned Russian Byzantologist Archimandrite Antonin (Kapustin) heads the Russian Ecclesiastical Mission in the Holy Land, under whose tenure the Mission significantly expanded its presence in Palestine, acquiring multiple properties in an effort to preserve Orthodox Christian holy places and care for the needs of the many pilgrims flocking to the region.
1866 Beginning of the Great Cretan Revolution (1866–1869), officially proclaimed on 21 August 1866; the holocaust of Arkadi Monastery in Crete; charismatic Greek Orthodox lay theologian, preacher, ethicist and writer Apostolos Makrakis came to Athens, where for six months he delivered twenty speeches in Concord Square on the subject of  'The Work of the Fathers of 1821 and How it Can Best and Quickest Be Brought to a Conclusion' , which were published in the newspaper Justice, and republished in book form in 1886.
1871 Body of Patr. Gregory V returned to Athens and entombed in cathedral.
1872 Council of Constantinople (Pan-Orthodox Synod) is convened and presided over by Ecumenical Patriarch Anthimus VI, and attended by Patriarchs Sophronius IV of Alexandria and Procopius II of Jerusalem and several bishops, condemning phyletism (ethnocentric belief that Orthodox Christians in a given place and time should be divided into separate exarchates, based on ethnicity), and condemning the Bulgarian Exarchate; the decisions of this council are later accepted by the other local Orthodox Churches.Orthodox Christian Laity. The 1872 Council of Constantinople and Phyletism. 23 February 2012.
1873 Philotheos Bryennios discovers the  Didache  in manuscript with copies of several early Church documents.
1874 Death of Venerable Joseph Gerontogiannis, ascetic of Crete.
1875 Giovanni Marango (Grk: Ιωάννης Μαραγκός) is installed as a Roman Catholic Archbishop in Athens, being the first Roman hierarch in Athens since 1458, when Niccolò Protimo of Euboea (the last Latin titular Archbishop of Athens) departed; a Patriarchal and Synodal Decision was sent to all Bishops everywhere, whereby the manner of reception of Latin converts was left to the judgement of the local Bishops.
1877 Death of Arsenios of Paros.St Arsenius of Paros. OCA – Lives of the Saints.
1878 Council of Athens, convened and presided over by Metr. Procopius I of Athens, condemned the Makrakists, obtaining closure of Apostolos Makrakis' "School of the Logos" on the pretext that it taught doctrines opposed to the tenets of the Church, and addressed an encyclical to the whole body of Christians in Greece that was read in the churches, charging Makrakis with attempting to introduce innovations; Cyprus is ceded to Britain by Ottoman Empire at the Congress of Berlin.

1880–1917 Emigration of approximately 400,000 Greeks to the United States, many as hired labor for the railroads and mines of the American West.C. Moskos. "The Greeks in the United States." In: R. Clogg (cd.). The Greek Diaspora in the Twentieth Century. St. Martin's Press, New York, 1999. p.105.
1881–1883 During the patriarchate of Joachim III, the Great School of the Nation was housed in a new large building in the area of the Phanar.

1882 Thessaly and part of Epirus added to the Church of Greece, after the Ottomans cede Thessali"Thessaly." Encyclopædia Britannica. Encyclopædia Britannica 2009 Ultimate Reference Suite. Chicago: Encyclopædia Britannica, 2009. and Arta regions to Greece (1881).
1885 Prominent Greek painter Nicholaos Gysis paints the famous  "Secret school"  ("κρυφό σχολειό"), referring to the underground schools provided by the Greek Orthodox Church in monasteries and churches during the time of Ottoman rule in Greece (15th–19th centuries) for keeping alive Orthodox Christian doctrines and Greek language and literacy.
1888  Typikon of the Great Church of Christ  is published with revised church services, prepared by Protopsaltis George Violakis, issued with the approval and blessing of the Ecumenical Patriarch, while the Sabaite (monastic) Typikon continued to be used in the Church of Russia; Council of Constantinople, convened and presided over by Patriarch Dionysius V, and attended by several bishops, permits the reception of Western converts to Orthodoxy by the rite of Chrismation as an act of economia (dispensation) in extreme circumstances; death of Venerable Saint Panagis of Lixouri (Cephalonia).
1889 German Protestant historian Ferdinand Gregorovius writes "History of Athens in the Middle Ages. From Justinian to the Turkish Conquest." (Stuttgart, 1889).
1891 Death of Greek historian and Byzantinist Constantine Paparrigopoulos, considered the founder of modern Greek historiography, who analysed Greek history from the ancient era to the present age as a continuous history in his multi-volume History of the Hellenic Nation (6 vols, 1860-1877), also known for his original research in Byzantine history.
1894 On 8 March, Nektarios of Pentapolis was appointed Dean of the Rizarios Ecclesiastical School, remaining as Dean until 1908, becoming a spiritual guide to many; Apostolos Makrakis made his tenth and last Gospel tour, visiting Thebes, St. Theodore, Levadeia, Atalante, Chalkis, Kyme, Aliverion, Kariston, Gaurion on the islands of Andros, Syros, and his birthplace Siphnos.
1895 Council of Constantinople, convened and presided over by Patriarch Anthimus VII, and attended by 13 bishops, condemns all the Franco-Latin heresies, including the new false dogma of the so-called Immaculate Conception of the Virgin Mary by St. Anne, and the blasphemous teaching that the pope is supposedly infallible and undeposable.
1897 Greco-Turkish War (1897).
1899 Council of Constantinople, convened and presided over by Ecumenical Patriarch Constantine V, and attended by several bishops, deposes the newly elected Patriarch Meletius II (Doumani) of Antioch, on the grounds of phyletism, due to the fact that the latter had been elected by an anti-Greek, pro-Arab party within the Antiochene Patriarchate, a similar party to that which caused the Melkite schism of 1724 and subsequent union with the Latins.

19th century Statistical figures for the population of Anatolia (Asia Minor) in the 19th century show that Christians constituted a minority of considerable importance: of the 12,254,459 total inhabitants, 9,676,714 (78.96%) were Muslim, and 2,350,272 (19.2%) were Christian, of which the Greek Orthodox element amounted to 1,016,722 or 8.3%.
1901 Evangelika riots in Athens Greece in November, over translations of the New Testament into Demotic (Modern) Greek, resulting in the fall of both the government and Metropolitan of Athens, and withdrawal of publications from circulation.
1902 Theocletus I (Minopoulos) becomes Metropolitan of Athens (1902-1917); Church of Greece takes responsibility for Greek Orthodox parishes in Australasia from the Church of Jerusalem.
1904 Ecumenical Patriarchate publishes the Patriarchal Text, based on about twenty Byzantine manuscripts, the standard text of the Greek-speaking Orthodox churches today.
 
1904–1910 Nektarios of Pentapolis began building the Convent of the Holy Trinity on the island of Aegina, while yet Dean of the Rizarios Hieratical School (until 1908).
1905 Death of Apostolos Makrakis; death of Elder Pachomios of Chios, founder of the Skete of the Holy Fathers in Chios (Cloister of Aghion Pateron), as well as the spiritual guide of St. Nektarios of Pentapolis (†1920) and St. Anthimos (Vagianos) of Chios (†1960), and an opponent of syncretistic ecumenism.

1906 Assassination of Metr. Photios Kalpidis of Korytsa and Premeti (1902–1906), Ethnomartyr. Χρήστος Γ. Ανδρεάδης. Ο Κορυτσάς και Πρεμετής Φώτιος Καλπίδης (1862–1906): Ο πόντιος εθνομάρτυς ιεράρχης, πρώτο θύμα του μακεδονικού αγώνα. Κυριακίδη Αφοί ΑΕ, 2004. 526 pages. 
1907 Foundation of Zoe Brotherhood, an extra-ecclesiastical organization founded by Archim. Eusebius Matthopoulos (1849-1929); ordination in Constantinople of Fr. Raphael Morgan, "Priest-Apostolic to America and the West Indies" (Ιεραποστολος), and the first African-American Orthodox priest.
1908 Death of Methodia of Kimolos;Great Synaxaristes : Ἡ Ὁσία Μεθοδία ἐκ Κιμώλου. 5 Οκτωβρίου. ΜΕΓΑΣ ΣΥΝΑΞΑΡΙΣΤΗΣ. the Church of Greece was temporarily given jurisdiction of the Greek Church in America (1908-1922) and the Greek Church in Australia (1908-1924) under an agreement made between the Ecumenical Patriarchate of Constantinople and the Holy Synod of Athens; Nektarios of Pentapolis took up permanent residence on Aegina, where he spent the last years of his life, devoting himself to the direction of his convent and to very intense prayer.

1911 Assassination of Aimilianos Lazaridis (el), Metropolitan of Grevena. Αφιέρωμα στον Μακεδονικό Αγώνα: Ιερά Μητρόπολη Δημητριάδος
1912 Kyriopascha occurs; Balkan Wars (1912-1913); Council of Constantinople, convened and presided over by Patriarch Joachim III, and attended by several bishops, condemns the Onomatodoxi (name-worshippers), who believed that the name of God is God Himself; ratification of the new General Regulations governing Mount Athos, which was drawn up by Patriarch Joachim III and the Athonite monks; in November, the Holy Mountain was liberated by the Greek fleet.
1913 The Athonite monks pass a resolution declaring the administrative autonomy of the Monastic State, within the Greek State; after Cretan deputies unilaterally declared union with Greece in 1908, Crete is finally ceded to Greece by the Treaty of London (1913), which ended the First Balkan War; Epirus, Macedonia and the eastern Aegean Islands are liberated as per the Treaty of Bucharest (1913), coming under the administration of the Greek Church, but remaining under the nominal authority of the Patriarch of Constantinople.
1914–18 World War I.
1914 According to the Corfu Protocol of 17 May 1914, Northern Epirus is granted autonomy within Albania; Byzantine & Christian Museum is founded in Athens, becoming one of the most important museums in the world in Byzantine Art.

1914-23 Greek genocide eliminates the Greek Orthodox population of Anatolia, with approximately 750,000 Greeks of Asia Minor massacred and another 750,000 exiled.
1916 In a long letter to the President of the Council dated 10/23 November 1916, liberal politician Andreas Michalakopoulos (one of Eleftherios Venizelos' most important colleagues), expounded the necessity of a profound reform of the Greek Church, the objective of which was its complete Westernization; during the National Schism that had divided Greece, Archbishop Theokletos I of Athens (1848–1931) anathematized and excommunicated Eleftherios Venizelos in one of the most memorable events of Greek history, on 12 December 1916.
1917 Metr. Theocletus I is deposed, as the hierarchy of the Greek Church changed in accordance with political control of the country; in the Pafra region of Western Pontus, a large force of the Turkish army sent by Refet Bele Pasha and commanded by Mehmet Ali besieged the monastery of the Theotokos from 17–21 April 1917, killing approximately 650 women and children, and 60 armed Pontian insurgents. Antexoume.wordpress.com. 1. Η ΜΑΤΩΜΕΝΗ ΣΠΗΛΙΑ ΤΗΣ ΟΤΚΑΓΙΑ!. WWW.OLYMPIA.GR. Μαΐου 17, 2013. Retrieved: 19 August 2014.
1918 Meletius III (Metaxakis) becomes Metropolitan of Athens (1918-1920); Allied Occupation of Constantinople (1918-1923); the "St. Sophia Redemption Committee" is formed in Britain after the Armistice, whose members included two future Foreign Secretaries and many prominent public figures, seeking to restore Hagia Sophia into an Orthodox Church (1918–1922); Roman Catholic opposition to the St Sophia Redemption Committee included Msgr. Manuel Bidwell (Chancellor of the Archdiocese of Westminster) who was on the initial committee, Roman Catholic British MP Sir Stuart Coats also on the committee, Cardinal Pietro Gasparri the Papal Secretary of State, and the Vatican who wished to block St. Sophia becoming a Greek Orthodox Church (according to the Grand Vizier of Constantinople who had an offer of Papal support).

1918–1924 Emigration of 70,000 Greeks to the United States,The Federation of Hellenic Societies of Greater New York. Greeks in the U.S.A. Retrieved: 5 February 2013. many of which were de jure denaturalized from Anatolia.
1919–1922 Greco-Turkish War.
1920 Death of Nektarios of Pentapolis (Aegina);St Nectarius Kephalas the Metropolitan of Pentapolis. OCA – Lives of the Saints. Chrysanthos (Philippidis), Bp. of Trebizond is condemned to death in absentia by a Court Martial in Ankara; Dodecanese Islands ceded to Greece under the Treaty of Sèvres, but treaty is never ratified; the Italian administration attempted a forcible Latinisation of the people of the Dodecanese Islands, with spoken Greek and Greek Orthodox observances being banned in public from 1920; Treaty of Sèvres cedes Eastern Thrace and Ionia (Zone of Smyrna) to Greece, as well as Greek control over the Aegean islands commanding the Dardanelles, but is superseded in 1923 by the Treaty of Lausanne by which these areas were again lost; publication of Encyclical Letter by Constantinople entitled “Unto the Churches of Christ Everywhere”, on the subject of Christian unity and the Ecumenical Movement, criticized as ecumenistic ecclesiology.The Patriarchal Encyclical of 1920: A Collection of Short Critiques. Orthodox Christian Information Center. From: Metropolitan Cyprian of Oropos and Fili. The Panheresy of Ecumenism. Etna, CA: The Center for Traditionalist Orthodox Studies, 1995. pp. 14-19. Retrieved: 23 August 2013.

1921 Greek Orthodox Archdiocese of America formally founded; by a decision of the Kemalist government, all the Metropolitans, Bishops, and Archimandrites of the Pontus region were obliged to abandon Pontus and leave their seats; death of Hieromartyr Euthymios (Agritellis) of Zela, last resident Bishop of the Diocese of Zela in Western Pontus.
1922 All Dioceses within the Greek Kingdom are elevated to Metropolises; Asia Minor Catastrophe ensues after the Greek army is routed at the Battle of Dumlupınar (Μάχη του Τουμλού Μπουνάρ), the last battle in the Greco-Turkish War (1919–22), marking the beginning of the end for the Greek presence in Anatolia; death of martyr Metr. Chrysostomos (Kalafatis) of Smyrna, lynched by a Turkish mob incited by Nureddin Pasha on Sunday 10 September; martyrdom of Metr. Gregory (Orologas) of Kydonies, Ethno-Hieromartyr;Stamatopoulos, Dimitrios. "Gregorios of Cydoniae". Transl. Velentzas, Georgios. Encyclopaedia of the Hellenic World, Asia Minor. 5/22/2002. Retrieved: 11 August 2014. martyrdom of Metr. Ambrosios (Pleianthidis) of Moschonisia, Ethno-Hieromartyr; the predominantly Orthodox Christian city of Smyrna is destroyed, ending 1,900 years of Christian civilization, and a 3,000-year-old Greek presence in the area; in September 1922 the schismatic Turkish Orthodox Church is formed in Kayseri by Euthymios Karahisarithis ("Papa Efthim"), a supporter of Turkish nationalists, with the backing of Kemal Atatürk.

1923 Death of the Prokopios Lazaridis, Metropolitan of Iconium, by poisoning after being imprisoned by Turks in Kayseri prisons; by decision of the Holy Synod, the title "Metropolitan of Athens" became "Archbishop of Athens and All Greece"; Chrysostomos I (Papadopoulos) becomes Metropolitan of Athens in March 1923, elevated to Archbishop of Athens on 31 December 1923, (1923-1938); Exchange of Christian and Muslim population between Greece and Turkey, with around 1.2 million Orthodox Christians leaving Turkey (Greek refugees); the Greek-Orthodox, Turkish-speaking Karamanlides are expelled from Turkey as part of the Greek-Turkish population exchange of 1923; Treaty of Lausanne affirmed the international status of the Ecumenical Patriarchate, with Turkey guaranteeing respect and the Patriarchate's full protection, also granting control of the Holy Mountain to Greece; Patriarch ceases to be regarded as head of the Christian Orthodox Millet (millet-i Rûm) in Turkey; Patr. Meletios IV (Metaxakis) promulgates reformed calendar at the Pan-Orthodox Congress of Constantinople in May 1923, which had also proposed cutting the clergy's beard and hair, on replacing the rason with the dress of Anglican clergy, and finally on the possibility of an Orthodox Priest marrying a second time, while leaving the matter of the regulation of the number of fast days and the length of fasts to the local Churches; Greek government adopts Gregorian calendar; translation of the relics of New Martyr Theocharis of Neapolis, Cappadocia (1740) to the Church of Saint Catherine, Thessaloniki.

See also
 Eastern Orthodoxy in Greece

List of archbishops of Athens
Greek Orthodox Church
Eastern Orthodox Church organizationHistoryHistory of the Eastern Orthodox Church
History of Eastern Christianity
History of the Eastern Orthodox Church under the Ottoman Empire
History of Eastern Orthodox Churches in the 20th century
Timeline of Eastern Orthodoxy in AmericaChurch FathersApostolic Fathers
Church Fathers
Ante-Nicene Fathers (book)
Desert Fathers
Nicene and Post-Nicene Fathers
List of Church Fathers

Notes

References

BibliographyGreek War of Independence David Brewer. The Greek War of Independence : the struggle for freedom from Ottoman oppression and the birth of the modern Greek nation. Woodstock, N.Y. : Overlook Press, 2001. 393pp.
 Douglas Dakin. The Greek struggle for independence, 1821–1833. London, Batsford 1973.
 Joseph Braddock. The Greek Phoenix: The Struggle for Liberty from the Fall of Constantinople to the Creation of a New Greek Nation. NY. Coward, McCann & Geoghegan. 1973. 1st ed. 233 pp.
 Nikiforos P. Diamandouros [et al.] (Eds.). Hellenism and the First Greek war of Liberation (1821–1830): Continuity and Change. The Modern Greek Studies Association of the United States and Canada. Thessaloniki: Institute for Balkan Studies, 1976.Modern Greece' Christos Yannaras. Orthodoxy and the West: Hellenic Self-Identity in the Modern Age. Transl. Peter Chamberas and Norman Russell. Brookline: Holy Cross Orthodox Press, 2006. 
 Giannēs Koliopoulos and Thanos Veremēs. Greece: The Modern Sequel, from 1831 to the Present. NYU Press, 2002. 407 pp. 
 C.M. Woodhouse. Modern Greece. 4th ed. Boston : Faber and Faber, 1986.
 Charles A. Frazee. The Orthodox Church and independent Greece, 1821–1852. Cambridge University Press 1969.
 Demetrios J. Constantelos. Understanding the Greek Orthodox Church: Its Faith, History and Life. 4th Edition. Brookline, Mass.: Hellenic College Press, 2005. 
 Dimitri E. Conomos, Graham Speake. Mount Athos, the Sacred Bridge: The Spirituality of the Holy Mountain. Oxford: Peter Lang, 2005.
 Herman A. Middleton. Precious Vessels of the Holy Spirit: The Lives & Counsels of Contemporary Elders of Greece. 2nd Ed. Protecting Veil Press, 2004.
 John L. Tomkinson. Between Heaven and Earth: The Greek Church. Anagnosis Books, Athens, 2004.
 Rev. Dr. Nicon D. Patrinacos (M.A., D.Phil. (Oxon)). A Dictionary of Greek Orthodoxy – Λεξικον Ελληνικης Ορθοδοξιας. Light & Life Publishing, Minnesota, 1984.
 Rev. A. H. Hore. Eighteen centuries of the Orthodox Greek Church. London: James Parker & Co. 1899. 706pp. (Re-printed: Gorgias Press LLC, 2003.'')

19th century in Greece
20th century in Greece
Cultural history of Greece
Greek Orthodoxy in Greece
Orthodoxy in Greece
 
Orthodox Church